Robert Kirkman's The Walking Dead: Invasion is a post-apocalyptic horror novel written by Jay Bonansinga and released October 6, 2015. The novel is a spin-off of The Walking Dead comic book series and continues to explore the story the character Lilly Caul. Invasion is the second book in a second four-part series of novels.

Plot
Out of the ashes of the devastated Woodbury, Georgia, two opposing camps of survivors develop - each one on a collision course with the other. Underground, in the labyrinth of ancient tunnels and mine shafts, Lilly Caul and her crew of senior citizens, misfits, and children struggle to build a new life. However, Caul wants her town of Woodbury back from the undead, and now the only thing that stands in her way roams in the backwaters of Georgia. In the backwaters, the psychotic Reverend Jeremiah Garlitz rebuilds his army of followers with a secret weapon. He wants to destroy Lilly and her crew - the people who vanquished his church cult - and he has the means to bring hell down upon the tunnel dwellers.

The confrontation between these two factions unleashes an unthinkable weapon - forged from the hordes of undead, perfected by a madman, and soaked in the blood of the weak.

References

2015 American novels
Thomas Dunne Books books
Invasion